Valeria Sergeyevna Merkusheva (also romanized Valeriya Sergeevna; born 20 September 1999) is a Russian ice hockey goaltender and member of the Russian national ice hockey team, currently playing in the Zhenskaya Hockey League (ZhHL) with SKIF Nizhny Novgorod.

She represented Russia at the 2019 IIHF Women's World Championship and at the 2019 Winter Universiade, and represented the Russian Olympic Committee at the 2021 IIHF Women's World Championship.

References

External links
 

1999 births
Living people
Ice hockey people from Moscow
Russian women's ice hockey goaltenders
HC SKIF players
Competitors at the 2019 Winter Universiade
Universiade medalists in ice hockey
Universiade gold medalists for Russia
Ice hockey players at the 2022 Winter Olympics
Olympic ice hockey players of Russia